The Manjali Mosque is located on Satpayev Avenue in the center of Atyrau, Kazakhstan. 
Construction began in 1999 and was completed in 2001. The mosque opened for public use on 5 May 2001 and can accommodate 600 worshipers.

The mosque has a large dome with a height of 23 meters. Its outer diameter measures at 7 metres and inner diameter at 5 metres. The total area of the mosque, including the grounds surrounding it, is 1328.3 square metres, with the mosque itself occupying 1093.1 sq.m. It consists of 2 floors, two large halls, five prayer rooms, men's and women's prayer rooms, a reading room, a madrassa, a library and additional rooms for men and women. The walls of the mosque are 15 metres in height. The relief atop the entrance door resembles a warrior's helmet. The mosque has two minarets with both having a height of 20.7 metres. The height of the minbar is 3 metres and made of high quality wood. The diameter of the remaining 6 small domes atop on the roof are 1 metre. Outside the mosque there is an additional building of 235.2 square metres. There are rooms for imams and families. There are also toilets for men and women.

References

Mosques in Atyrau
Mosques completed in 2001
2001 establishments in Kazakhstan